Curtis Mitchell (born March 11, 1989) is an American athlete, who specialises in the 100 and 200 meters.

Career
Mitchell was a 2008 & 2009 junior college 4 time outdoor all American and state champion in the 100 and 200 m at Southwestern College in San Diego.

Mitchell had a successful collegiate career for Texas A&M University. At the 2010 NCAA Indoor Championships he won the 200 m and was part of Texas A&M's winning team in the 4 × 400 m relay. His time in the 200 m was 20.38 s, the best indoor time in the world that year and a Texas A&M record. At the outdoor championships that year he placed second to Rondel Sorrillo in the 200 m, helping Texas A&M to their second consecutive NCAA team title.

In 2010, Mitchell represented the United States at the NACAC Under-23 Championships in Miramar, Florida, winning gold in both 200 m and the 4 × 100 m relay. In the 200 m semi-finals he clocked a wind-legal personal best of 19.99 s, placing him seventh in the world that year.

Mitchell turned professional in January 2011, forgoing his final year of collegiate eligibility to sign with Adidas and join the training group of two-time World Champion Tyson Gay.

Mitchell won Bronze at the 2013 IAAF World Championships behind Usain Bolt and Warren Weir in a time of 20.04 seconds.

References

External links
 
 

1989 births
Living people
Sportspeople from Daytona Beach, Florida
American male sprinters
World Athletics Championships medalists
Texas A&M Aggies men's track and field athletes
Texas A&M University alumni
USA Outdoor Track and Field Championships winners